Angellotti is an Italian surname. Notable people with the surname include:

Frank M. Angellotti (1861–1932), American judge
Marion Polk Angellotti (1887–1979), American writer
Nicolás Angellotti (born 1990), Argentine professional footballer

Italian-language surnames